The 2014 Liga Nusantara Riau season is the first edition of Liga Nusantara Riau is a qualifying round of the 2014 Liga Nusantara.

The competition scheduled starts in May 2014.

Teams
Provincial Association opens registration participating clubs since April 8 until April 15, 2014.

Until 23 April 2014 as many as 10 clubs have declared their participation is PPLP Dispora Riau, PS SMA Olahraga, PS Kampar, Bina Bakat F.C., PS Pekanbaru, Bintang Rokan Hilir, Indragiri F.C., Nabil F.C., Kuansing City F.C. and Dumai F.C.

While the other three teams, namely PS Air Melok, PS Selat Panjang and PS Bangkinang will still awaited confirmation finally.

Stadium and locations

League table

Result

References

Riau